Saint Peter's Battery was an artillery battery in Kalkara, Malta, built by Maltese insurgents during the French blockade of 1798–1800. It was part of a chain of batteries, redoubts and entrenchments encircling the French positions in Marsamxett and the Grand Harbour.

The battery was located about 300m to the rear of Capuchin Convent Battery, and was probably manned by militia from Żejtun. It possibly had a vaulted underground chamber which served as a barracks. Other details about the battery or its armament are unknown.

Like the other French blockade fortifications, St. Peter's Battery was dismantled, possibly sometime after 1814. No traces of it can be seen today.

References

Batteries in Malta
Kalkara
Military installations established in 1798
Demolished buildings and structures in Malta
French occupation of Malta
Vernacular architecture in Malta
Limestone buildings in Malta
1798 establishments in Malta
18th-century fortifications
18th Century military history of Malta